Tomás Enrique Araya Díaz (born June 6, 1961) is a Chilean-American musician, best known as the vocalist and bassist of American thrash metal band Slayer. Araya is ranked 58th by Hit Parader on their list of the 100 Greatest Metal Vocalists of All Time. Before Slayer was disbanded in 2019, Araya, along with Kerry King, were the only members who stayed in the band since its inception. 

Araya was employed as a respiratory therapist in the early 1980s and used his earnings to finance Slayer's debut album Show No Mercy (1983). Much of Araya's lyrical content is about serial killers, a subject he finds interesting; his first credited lyrical contribution was the vampire-themed track "At Dawn They Sleep" from 1985's Hell Awaits.

Early life and career
Tomás Enrique Araya Diaz was born in Viña del Mar, Chile, but his family moved to the US when he was five. He grew up in Los Angeles. His older brother, Cisco, played guitar. This inspired Araya to pick up bass at age eight. The two played Beatles and Rolling Stones songs, which he would later cite as an influence on his own music.

In the early 1980s, Araya's eldest sister suggested he enroll in a program to become certified as a respiratory therapist. Araya's father insisted he either find a job or enroll in the course. Araya enrolled in a two-year technical course, learning about air mixture ratios, drawing blood, and how to intubate.

In 1981, Araya was approached by Kerry King, who asked Araya to join his band, Slayer. Araya accepted, using his earnings as a respiratory therapist to finance the band's 1983 debut album Show No Mercy. Araya requested time off of work from his employer, the Brotman Medical Center, for Slayer's first European tour in 1984 and was denied; We need you to come in today.' They'd call me at 5:00 in the morning and wake me, 'Someone's not coming in, we need you to come in to work. After a month of sporadic attendance, his employers threatened termination; Araya replied "Well, I guess I'm fired." Along with King, Araya was one of the two original members to remain in Slayer for the entire length of the band's career, from 1981 to 2019.

In 2006, Araya underwent gallbladder surgery, which disrupted The Unholy Alliance tour. Originally set to launch on June 6, the tour was postponed to June 13. Araya was also unable to finish the vocals for a song entitled "Final Six", which was to be included on Slayer's 2006 album Christ Illusion; later released on the special edition of the album. Araya brought his children on the tour stating "it's kind of cool to expose them at such a young age. My first concert, I was, like, 17."
"We [Slayer] have been fortunate- fortunate enough to have lasted as long as we have because a lot of bands don't last that long."

On January 7, 2010, Slayer announced on its official website that back surgery had been scheduled for Araya and that the planned tour would be canceled through April of that year. The site assured fans, "Slayer camp working hard to reschedule dates for later this year." Araya is known for his aggressive headbanging and began experiencing back problems while the band was on tour in Australia/New Zealand/Japan in October 2009. He had an anterior cervical discectomy and fusion. "The surgeon opened up my throat from the front", he explained. "Apparently it's easier that way. They pushed my oesophagus over to one side and did the repair work. It seems to have done the trick but I can't headbang anymore." As a result of his surgery, Araya has significantly tempered his once aggressive on-stage movement and headbanging; now remaining relatively still during performances.

On March 12, 2010, Metal Hammer magazine published an interview with Slayer's Dave Lombardo about Araya's recovery. Lombardo stated, "He's recovering extremely quickly and really well. He is just moving forward and doing all the treatments and post operation stuff that he has to go through. He's doing good."

On May 20, 2010, Slayer confirmed that they would play two songs on TV for Jimmy Kimmel Live!

On June 3, 2011, Araya received the keys to the city of his birth, Viña del Mar.

In 2014, Araya made a cameo in the heavy metal horror film Hairmetal Shotgun Zombie Massacre: The Movie, directed by Joshua Allan Vargas.

From May 2018 to November 2019, with the last show being in their hometown Los Angeles, Slayer embarked on what they called their final world tour and eventually dissolved.

Lyrics

Araya's interest in serial killers serves as inspiration for many of his lyrics, including the songs titled "213" about Jeffrey Dahmer and "Dead Skin Mask" about Ed Gein. "I'm trying to see where these guys are coming from so maybe I'll understand. It's always kind of intrigued me…"

Araya wrote the lyrics for the Grammy Award-winning song "Eyes of the Insane" from Slayer's 2006 album Christ Illusion. The lyrics were inspired by an article in the Texas Monthly about the casualties of war and the experiences of soldiers coping with physical and psychological trauma. Araya stated, "At points in their tour of Iraq, they need help and the military tends to ignore that, they kind of brush it under the mat and hopes it goes away. They try to make everything seem hunky dory and fine and dandy, when in actuality there is a lot of stuff going on that people can't handle. There's a lot of soldiers coming home with mental anguish. And the sad part is, we heard about post-traumatic stress after Vietnam and the first Gulf War and the military seems to want to wipe the slate clean with every new war."

Personal life
Araya has a brother, Juan "Johnny" Araya, who currently plays bass in the melodic death metal band Thine Eyes Bleed. He has also occasionally worked as a roadie for Slayer.

Araya resides in Buffalo, Texas, where he owns a ranch with his wife Sandra Araya and two children, daughter Ariel Asa Araya (b. 1996) and son Tomas Enrique Araya Jr. (b. 1998).  He and his wife run a family ranch that includes 60+ head of cattle among other ranch animals. Araya reports that he sings country songs to help keep his "singing chops up". Araya and his wife enjoy horror films such as The Amityville Horror and The Texas Chain Saw Massacre. The two allowed their children to watch horror films, but made it clear to them that it is just a movie when they asked "Is this real?" His children were homeschooled.

Araya suffers from sleep apnea and uses a CPAP machine regularly at home and on tour.

In 2010, Araya underwent neck surgery after years of headbanging. The operation went well but he could no longer perform the dramatic motions he used to display, which was something he really missed doing. While on tour, his brother made a special "weight belt" for Araya to play the bass without straining his neck. After the recovery period ended, he reverted to using standard bass straps.

Religion
Araya is a practicing Roman Catholic. In an interview, he expressed his belief that "…Christ came and taught us about love, about doing unto others. That was his preach: Accept each other for who we are. Live peacefully, and love one another." When asked if he believed in God, he replied "I believe in a supreme being, yeah. But He's an all-loving God." Araya explained that he has a "really strong belief system", and Slayer's images and words will "never interfere with what I believe and how I feel… People are not in good shape to where they have to question their own belief system because of a book or a story somebody wrote, or a Slayer song."

Araya commented about the misconception of the band labeled as Satan worshippers, "Yeah, yeah I think that's one of the biggest misconceptions towards the band, but next to that just the fact that we're normal." If guitarist King writes a good song, Araya puts his beliefs aside, "I'm not one that's going to go, 'This sucks because it's contrary to my beliefs.' To me it's more like 'This is really good stuff. You're going to piss people off with this.

In 2016, Araya further explained that the main reason Slayer used satanic imagery was to scare people, in particular, the "Hollywood people", wanting to separate themselves from the "androgynous Sunset Strip metal scene of the 1980s".

Guest appearances
 Dirt with Alice in Chains (1992)
 Start The Riot (song) Atari Teenage Riot (1998)
 Primitive with Soulfly (2000)
 Rise Above: 24 Black Flag Songs to Benefit the West Memphis Three with Rollins Band (2002)Hairmetal Shotgun Zombie Massacre: The Movie (2014)

Equipment

Araya endorses Marshall amplifiers and ESP guitars which are currently marketing Tom Araya signature bass guitars. He was one of the first bassists to have a signature ESP bass series.
 ESP – Tom Araya signature bass
 B.C. Rich bass guitars
 Fender Precision Bass (seen in early photos of Slayer live performances)
 EMG pickups
 Bartolini pickups
 Dunlop strings 50-110 (heavy, stainless steel)
 D'Addario Picks and straps (he used his fingers before 1988's South of Heaven'')
 Marshall VBA400
 Marshall 8x10 cabinet

References

External links

1961 births
Living people
20th-century American guitarists
20th-century American male singers
20th-century American singers
20th-century Roman Catholics
21st-century American guitarists
21st-century American male singers
21st-century American singers
American heavy metal bass guitarists
American heavy metal singers
American male bass guitarists
American Roman Catholics
Catholics from California
Catholics from Texas
Chilean emigrants to the United States
Chilean people of Basque descent
Chilean people of Spanish descent
Chilean people of Peruvian descent
Chilean Roman Catholics
Guitarists from Los Angeles
Hispanic and Latino American musicians
Musicians from Los Angeles County, California
Musicians from Viña del Mar
People from Buffalo, Texas
People from Maywood, California
People from South Gate, California
People from Viña del Mar
Slayer members
Thrash metal musicians